Aramco World (formerly Saudi Aramco World) is a bi-monthly magazine published by Aramco Services Company, a US-based subsidiary of Saudi Aramco, the state-owned oil company of the Kingdom of Saudi Arabia. The first issue of the magazine appeared in November 1949. The bimonthly magazine is published in Houston, Texas.

While Saudi Arabia is still frequently the main feature of articles, the magazine also covers the wider Arabic and Muslim world, and is aimed at both company employees and other interested readers. The website also allows free access to back issues going back to the early 1960s, including photography.

In 2004, the magazine's website was awarded "Best Magazine Website" by the Web Marketing Association.

Selected articles

References

External links
 

Bimonthly magazines published in the United States
Business magazines published in the United States
Magazines established in 1949
Magazines published in Saudi Arabia
Magazines published in Texas
Mass media in Houston
Petroleum magazines
Saudi American
Saudi Aramco